Harry Hampton (March 21, 1889 – May 5, 1965) was a Scottish-American professional golfer. His best finish in a major championship was a tie for third place in the 1920 PGA Championship when he met Jock Hutchison (the eventual winner of the tournament) in a semi-final match and lost 4 and 3. He finished T7 in the 1927 U.S. Open and won seven tournaments during his professional playing career. Hampton was a good iron player and made 16 holes-in-one in his lifetime.

Early life
Hampton was born on March 21, 1889 in Montrose, Scotland. He emigrated to the United States in 1910.

Golf career
Hampton was described as a good ball striker, however his putting was adversely affected by poor vision in one eye. Hampton served as professional at a number of clubs in Massachusetts and was also posted at clubs in South Carolina, Virginia, Ohio, Michigan, Illinois, and Canada.

In May 1921, Hampton's eleven American teammates boarded the RMS Aquitania at New York and sailed to Southampton from where they traveled by train to Gleneagles at Perthshire, Scotland, where the forerunner to the Ryder Cup, the "International Challenge", would be played beginning on June 6, 1921. Hampton, even though he was selected for the team, for reasons unknown decided at the last moment that he would not make the trip. The likely reason was that he was not an American citizen. In order to become a team member it was required that all players be either U.S. born or naturalized American citizens. Hampton wasn't naturalized until 1955. The American team, captained by Emmett French, was taken to the woodshed for a 10½ to 4½ beating.

Personal
On November 10, 1911 he married Victoria Mary Harding (1887–1973) in Canada. He became a U.S. citizen in 1955.

Death
Hampton died in Santa Monica, California, on May 5, 1965.

Tournament wins (7)

PGA Tour wins (2)
1922 Pinehurst Amateur-Pro Best-Ball
1926 Southeastern PGA Championship

Other wins (5)
1911 Nova Scotia Open
Jacksonville Open
1923 Michigan Open
Miami Open
1930 Illinois PGA Senior Championship

Results in major championships

Note: Hampton never played in the Masters Tournament or The Open Championship.

NYF = Tournament not yet founded
NT = No tournament
DNP = Did not play
WD = Withdrew
? = Unknown

R64, R32, R16, QF, SF = Round in which player lost in PGA Championship match play
"T" indicates a tie for a place
Yellow background for top-10

Sources:

References

Scottish male golfers
American male golfers
PGA Tour golfers
People from Montrose, Angus
Sportspeople from Angus, Scotland
People from Santa Monica, California
Scottish emigrants to the United States
1889 births
1965 deaths